Martti Korhonen (born 27 February 1953 in Oulu) is a Finnish politician and member of Finnish Parliament, representing the Left Alliance. He was first elected to the parliament in 1991 and as the chairperson of his party in 2006. Korhonen served as the Minister of Regional and Municipal affairs under Paavo Lipponen's second Cabinet (1999–2003).

External links
 Official Website 

1953 births
Living people
People from Oulu
Finnish People's Democratic League politicians
Left Alliance (Finland) politicians
Government ministers of Finland
Members of the Parliament of Finland (1991–95)
Members of the Parliament of Finland (1995–99)
Members of the Parliament of Finland (1999–2003)
Members of the Parliament of Finland (2003–07)
Members of the Parliament of Finland (2007–11)
Members of the Parliament of Finland (2011–15)